Béatrice Altariba (born 18 June 1939) is a French actress who was active between 1956 and 1969.

Biography
Born in Marseille, she is the niece of symbolist poet Paul Fort. She started her career in revues and musical theatre, then she made her film debut at 17. Altariba was also active in Italian cinema. Her last French television appearance was in the first episode of the TV series The Aeronauts in 1967.

Partial filmography 

 Pardonnez nos offenses (1956) - Sassia
 Lorsque l'enfant paraît (1956) - Natacha
 L'Homme et l'Enfant (1956) - Hélène Mercier
 Women's Club (1956) - Dominique
 Les violents (1957) - Lisiane Chartrain
 L'Ami de la famille (1957) - Sophie
 Le Triporteur (1957) - Popeline
 Les Misérables (1958) - Cosette
 Le temps des oeufs durs (1958) - Lucie Grandvivier
 Be Beautiful But Shut Up (1958) - Olga Babitcheff
 Le petit prof (1959) - Françoise
 Eyes Without a Face (1960) - Paulette
 Monsieur Robinson Crusoe (1960) - Popeline
 Les pique-assiette (1960) - Laurence
 Behind Closed Doors (1961) - La sposina
 Three Faces of Sin (1961) - Une invitée au vernissage
 A Man Named Rocca (1961) - Maud
 Crazy Desire (1962) - Silvana
 Totò Diabolicus (1962) - Diana
 The Seventh Sword (1962) - Isabella
 The Young Racers (1963) - Monique
 Hold-up à Saint-Trop''' (1963)
 La banda Casaroli (1963) - Ragazza Al Bar
 The Four Musketeers' (1963) - Anne d'Autriche
 The Gorillas (1964) - Sylvie Danlevent
 On Murder Considered as One of the Fine Arts (1964)
 Su e giù (1965) - (segment "Questione di principio")
 Agent 3S3: Passport to Hell (1965) - Elisa von Sloot
 Le caïd de Champignol (1966) - Evelyne
 Et la femme créa l'amour (1966) - Anouchka
 Darling Caroline (1968) - Une aristocrate chez Belhomme
 La Prisonnière (1968) - Une invitée au vernissage (uncredited)
 Cemetery Without Crosses (1969) - Saloon Woman (final film role)

References

External links 
 

French film actresses
1939 births
Actresses from Marseille
Living people
French stage actresses
20th-century French actresses